The State Management Scheme was the nationalisation of the brewing, distribution and sale of liquor in three districts of the United Kingdom from 1916 until 1973.
The main focus of the scheme, now commonly known as the Carlisle Experiment, was Carlisle and the surrounding district close to the armament factories at Gretna, founded in 1916 to supply explosives and shells to the British Army in the First World War. However, there were three schemes in total: Carlisle and Gretna, Cromarty Firth, and Enfield. In 1921 Carlisle and Gretna was split into two separate areas. Carlisle was the larger part and supplied some beer to Gretna. In 1922 the Enfield scheme ended and its public houses were sold back to private enterprise.

The scheme was privatised by Edward Heath's Conservative Government in 1971 and its assets were sold at auction in six lots, mostly to established brewing interests.

Ethos
A central pillar of the scheme was the ethos of disinterested management: public house managers had no incentive to sell liquor, which supported the aim of reducing drunkenness and its effects on the arms industry. From 1916 to 1919 the scheme had a "no treating" policy, forbidding the buying of rounds of drinks.

Architecture
The scheme also involved the refurbishment of public houses, and the demolition and replacement of substandard premises. Most of the new premises were designed by the scheme's chief architect, Harry Redfern in his New Model Inn style, which influenced the design of public houses in the rest of the UK.

References

Further reading
 John Hunt, A City Under the Influence: The Story of Half a Century of State Pubs, Lakescene 1971, 
 Olive Seabury, The Carlisle State Management Scheme: Its Ethos and Architecture, Bookcase Carlisle 2007, 

Former nationalised industries of the United Kingdom
History of Carlisle, Cumbria
1916 establishments in the United Kingdom
History of the London Borough of Enfield
History of Dumfries and Galloway
History of the Scottish Highlands
Ross and Cromarty
Alcohol law in the United Kingdom
Alcohol agencies